Clubul Sportiv de Fotbal CFR 1933 Timișoara, commonly known as CSF CFR 1933 Timișoara or as CFR Timișoara, is a Romanian football club based in Timișoara, Timiș County, founded in 1933. The club is currently playing in the Liga VI (6th tier). The team's best moment was during the 1947–48 season, when it was ranked 2nd in the Divizia A and reached the Romanian Cup final. However UTA Arad managed to beat them in both legs.

History
It was founded in 1933, a team that marks only two divisional appearances until World War II: 1937–1938, 5th place, in the Western League, Divizia C and 1940 -1941, 6th place, in the 1st series of Divizia B. In the 1944,  it participated in the Heroes Cup after winning a 6-3 match.

In the 1947–1948 season it manages to reach the final of the Romanian Cup, which they lost in front of the ITA Arad team and finished in second place in Divizia A, following the same ITA Arad. Until 1956 included, CFR Timișoara (since 1950 became Locomotive) only operates in Divizia A. Then 8 championships followed in Divizia B (in 1958–1959 the team returns to the name of CFR) so that, surprisingly, in 1965, relegate to Divizia C. But it returned after one year in Divizia B, under the leadership of coach Nicolae Godeanu.

In 1969–1970, an action to reorganize Timișoara football takes place, on which occasion CFR assigns some of its players to Politehnica Timișoara. Although lacking the chance of promotion, CFR produces the big surprise by returning to Division A, after 13 years, at the end of the championship 1969–1970. The happiness of the CFR lasted only one year (1970–1971), as the team returned to Divizia B, where it remained until 1979, when it relegated to Divizia C. From here, after only one year, it returned to the second tier where it remained until 1986. It spent another two years in the 3rd division (1986–1988) and still has an honorable participation in Divizia B, which will end, at the end of the 1996–1997 championship, to remain another three years in Divizia C, where, at the end of the 1999–2000 championship (17th place in the IV series), it relegates to the county championship.

In the 2003–2004 season it returns to Divizia C, and in 2004–2005 it promotes in Divizia B, where it evolved until the 2009–2010 season, when it was excluded from the championship due to financial arrears to two former players, but also because they failed to pay arbitration fees.

Honours

Leagues
Liga I
Runners-up (1): 1947–48
Liga II
Winners (1): 1969–70
Runners-up (3): 1958–59, 1962–63, 1990–91
Liga III
Winners (4): 1965–66, 1979–80, 1987–88, 2004–05
Liga IV – Timiș County
Winners (3): 2000–01, 2001–02, 2002–03
Liga V – Timiș County
Winners (1): 2010–11

Cups
Cupa României
Runners-up (1): 1947–48

References

External links
Official CFR Timișoara website

Association football clubs established in 1933
Football clubs in Timiș County
Sport in Timișoara
Liga I clubs
Liga II clubs
Liga III clubs
Liga IV clubs
1933 establishments in Romania
Railway association football clubs in Romania